Heroine is the second studio album by American post-hardcore band From First to Last. It was released on March 21, 2006 through Epitaph Records. It is the band's only album to feature Wes Borland, who plays bass, and the band's last album to feature lead vocalist Sonny Moore who left the band in November 2006, but has since re-joined in 2017.

Upon release, Heroine received generally positive reviews and charted at number 25 on the Billboard 200, selling more than 33,000 copies within its first week, and 91,000 copies in four months. It is the band's highest-selling album, and has sold more than 232,000 copies as of April 2008. As a result of its success, From First To Last was subject to a major label bidding war, ultimately signing to Capitol Records in July 2006.

Critical reception 

The album has received generally positive reviews from contemporary music critics. Corey Apar of Allmusic awarded the album 3 and a half stars out of 5, saying, "Heroine not only reveals distinctly stronger and more confident vocals, but also finds the band placing a greater emphasis on more intricate song arrangements," and chose "The Latest Plague", "World War Me", and "Waltz Moore" as the album's track picks. AbsolutePunk also gave a generally positive review, saying, "Gritty as hell, full of obscenities and soaring sing-along choruses, FFTL has successfully transformed their sound." Drowned in Sound awarded the album 7 out of 10 stars, saying that "while the sublime irony and overblown satire of their debut was lost on some, the quartet have refused to make the same mistake with Heroine," and that "while vocalist Sonny Moore's lyrics still leave much to be desired, he still portrays a real sense of emotion with his vocal style."

Track listing

B-Sides

Personnel 
From First to Last
 Sonny Moore – lead vocals
 Matt Good – lead guitar, vocals; programming (all tracks except 8)
 Travis Richter – rhythm guitar, unclean vocals
 Derek Bloom – drums, percussion

 Additional musicians
Wes Borland – bass
Brett Gurewitz – vocals (track 1)
Jaqueline Marie – vocals (track 1)
Atticus Ross – programming (track 8)

 Production
Ross Robinson – producer
Ryan Boesch – engineer
Kale Holmes – assistant engineer
Bernie Grundman – mastering
Tim Smith – management
Andy Wallace – mixing
Nick Pritchard – art direction, design
Lauren Steil – photography

Heroine EPK (Making of the Album) 
On YouTube:
 Part 1
 Part 2
 Part 3
 Part 4
 Part 5

Chart performance

Notes

External links 
 
 
 

From First to Last albums
2006 albums
Epitaph Records albums
Albums produced by Ross Robinson